Hallett House may refer to:

in the United States (by state then town)
Samuel I. Hallett House, Aspen, Colorado, listed on the National Register of Historic Places (NRHP) in Pitkin County
Hallett House (Denver, Colorado), a Denver Landmark
Seth Hallett House, Barnstable, Massachusetts, listed on the NRHP
Capt. William Hallett House, Barnstable, Massachusetts, listed on the NRHP
Hallett House (Medical Lake, Washington), listed on the National Register of Historic Places in Spokane County
Hallett House, a mansion in Wayne, New York built by Samuel Hallett on the "Aisle of Pines" estate.